Jošavka Donja (Cyrillic: Јошавка Доња) is a village in the municipality of Čelinac, Republika Srpska, Bosnia and Herzegovina.

Population

In the Census Years of 1981. and 1971. Jošavka Donja  and Jošavka Gornja were registered as the unique populated place.

References

Populated places in Čelinac
Villages in Republika Srpska